The Captain and His Hero is a 1955 West German drama film directed by Max Nosseck and starring Ernst Schröder, Jo Herbst and Fita Benkhoff. It was shot at the Spandau Studios in West Berlin. The film's sets were designed by the art director Hans Luigi.

Cast
 Ernst Schröder as Hauptmann Eisenhecker
 Jo Herbst as Paul Kellermann / Franz Kellermann
 Fita Benkhoff as Frau Kellermann
 Ilse Steppat as Yvonne
 Ingeborg Schöner as Ilse
 Fritz Wagner as Hauptmann Peppmöller
 Bruno Fritz as Hauptfeldwebel Krenke
 Günter Pfitzmann as Hauptmann Roeder
 Wolfgang Müller as Schreiber Kunze
 Ernst Stahl-Nachbaur as General
 Clemens Hasse as Unteroffizier Nebelzahn
 Wolfgang Gruner as Rekrut Ladiges
 Else Reval
 Joseph Noerden
 Ralf Wolter as Ängstlicher Rekrut
 Rolf Möbius
 Heinz Giese as Rekrutierungsoffizier
 Wolfgang Völz as Oberleutnant
 Curt Ackermann as General
 Werner Peters as Hauptmann Roeder
 Heinz Petruo as Stabsarzt bei Musterung
 Friedrich Schütter as Soldat

References

Bibliography

External links 
 

1955 films
1950s war drama films
German war drama films
West German films
1950s German-language films
Films directed by Max Nosseck
German World War II films
German films based on plays
German satirical films
1955 drama films
German black-and-white films
1950s German films
Films shot at Spandau Studios